A pacifist is one who opposes war, militarism, or violence.

Pacifist may also refer to:
 a member of a Pacifist organization
 a member of the Pacifist Party
 a believer of a pacifist faith
 The Pacifist (film), a 1970 film
 "The Pacifist", a 1956 Arthur C Clarke short story